Earl Maves (April 8, 1923 – March 10, 1952) was a player in the National Football League. He was a member of the Detroit Lions during the 1948 NFL season.

Maves died of Hodgkin's disease in 1952, having battled the disease for two years prior to his death.

References

People from Ladysmith, Wisconsin
Players of American football from Wisconsin
Detroit Lions players
Wisconsin Badgers football players
Michigan Wolverines football players
1923 births
1952 deaths
Deaths from Hodgkin lymphoma
Deaths from cancer in Wisconsin